Edward Postell King, Jr. (July 4, 1884 – August 31, 1958) was a major general in the United States Army who gained prominence for leading the defense of the Bataan Peninsula in the Battle of Bataan against the Japanese invasion of the Philippines in World War II.

Education
King was born in Atlanta, Georgia, in 1884. As the grandson and nephew of Confederate soldiers during the American Civil War, King had a strong desire to join the US Army. He entered the University of Georgia, where he was a member of the Phi Delta Theta fraternity, graduating in 1902.

Early military career
Initially, King's family wanted him to be a lawyer, but he desired a more adventurous career. He was commissioned as a second lieutenant of infantry in the Georgia National Guard in February 1905. King applied for and received a commission as a second lieutenant of field artillery in the Army in 1908. He served with distinction during World War I, earning the Distinguished Service Medal. On 9 July 1918, President Wilson authorized the awarding of the Army's Distinguished Service Medal to Major King, for exceptionally meritorious and distinguished services in a duty of great responsibility during World War I. As principal assistant to the chief of Field Artillery, from 23 March 1918 to 11 November 1918, Major King contributed largely to the successful solution of the difficult problems of expansion, organization, and training which then confronted the Field Artillery.

After the war, King was an honor graduate of the Command and General Staff School in 1923 and then graduated from the Army War College in 1930 and the Navy War College in 1937. Between World War I and World War II, he held several important assignments, including that of instructor in both the Army and Navy War Colleges. In 1940, King was sent to the Philippines, where he was promptly promoted to brigadier general; he served as General Douglas MacArthur's second highest-ranking ground officer, after General Jonathan Wainwright.

World War II
On 11 March 1942, by order of President Franklin D. Roosevelt, MacArthur left for Australia. Wainwright was appointed to succeed MacArthur as General of the Armies of the Philippines while King became the commanding general of the Philippine-American forces on the Bataan Peninsula.  At the time, King was the commander of the artillery.

After months of fighting the invading Japanese Army and with food and medicine exhausted, King himself, accepting sole responsibility to disobey MacArthur's and Wainwright's orders, chose to surrender his troops on 9 April 1942 (this day is commemorated in the Philippines as the Araw ng Kagitingan, or "Day of Valor"). A combined American and Filipino force of over 75,000 surrendered; this was the largest surrender of a military force in American history.  Thousands of these soldiers would die under Japanese captivity during the ensuing Bataan Death March and imprisonment.

Wainwright and his men, numbering 10,000, held on to Corregidor until they too were forced to surrender on 6 May 1942.

King spent three and half years as a captive of the Japanese, who often mistreated him due to his rank. Both Wainwright and King expected to be court-martialled for disobeying orders that they should not surrender. However, they were treated as heroes when they were finally freed.

Decorations

Postwar
After the war, King returned to the United States where he retired to a home in Georgia, devoting himself to many volunteer causes, such as the Red Cross. He died in 1958, and is buried at the Cemetery of St. John in the Wilderness Episcopal Church – Flat Rock, NC.

In literature
Writer John Grisham utilizes King as a character in his fictional novel The Reckoning. Part of the story takes place at Camp O'Donnell during World War II.

See also

Arnold J. Funk

References

 "The Battling Bastards of Bataan" Profile
 "King of Bataan". Thaddeus Holt. The Quarterly Journal of Military History 7:2 (1995)

External links 
Edward Postell King, Jr. Records, c1940s., Profiles of Honor Digital Collection, Library of Virginia.
Generals of World War II

1884 births
1958 deaths
People from Atlanta
University of Georgia alumni
Georgia National Guard personnel
Military personnel from Georgia (U.S. state)
United States Army personnel of World War I
Recipients of the Distinguished Service Medal (US Army)
United States Army Command and General Staff College alumni
United States Army War College alumni
United States Army War College faculty
Naval War College alumni
Naval War College faculty
United States Army generals of World War II
World War II prisoners of war held by Japan
Bataan Death March prisoners
United States Army generals